Kesh is a village in County Fermanagh, Northern Ireland. The 2011 Census recorded a population of 1,039 people. It is within Fermanagh and Omagh district.

Because of its location close to  Lough Erne the village has been a popular tourist resort. It has two caravan parks, a small attractive marina and other related industries both within its boundaries and the surrounding area.

History

Name

The toponym Kesh comes from ceis, the Irish word for 'wicker bridge', which refers to the crossing in the middle of the village. The village is not built around a parish church or chapel. Two Church of Ireland parishes of Magherculmoney and Tubrid meet at the river and their respective parish churches are each about  either side of the village.

Kesh began as a ford or crossing place on the Glendarragh River. In the past, Lough Erne came very much closer to the village than it does today. Before the first great Erne Drainage in the 1880s, the lake was about eight feet higher and, especially in time of flood, may almost have reached Kesh. The ráth on Rosscah Hill above the late Joe Robert's house (a former rectory of Drumkeeran Parish) indicates original settlement here probably as far back as the Iron Age, c. 2000 years ago. There are two ráths on this hill, but the nearer to the house is believed to be a decorative feature made at the time of the construction of the house in the late 1700s. The large standing stone in Rosculban may be a relic of the Iron Age as well.

After a time, the ford was augmented with a wicker bridge, for which the Gaelic word is ceis, and hence the village got its name. The name had been spelt in varying ways but generally as Kish or Cash until relatively modern times. An ancient saying in the locality, which may refer to basket making and osier working in the area, states that anyone gifted with a big behind "had an arse on them like a Kesh creel."

Crevenish Castle
The remains of Crevenish Castle are south-east of the village on the Crevenish Road, or 'the back road' as the locals call it. During its time it was home to the Blennerhasset and Maguire families in the seventeenth-century and eighteenth-century.

The Troubles

On 2 December 1984, 28-year old Alistair Slater, a member of 22 SAS of the British Army, and 27-year-old Antoine Mac Giolla Bhrighde, a Provisional Irish Republican Army (IRA) volunteer, were both shot dead during an IRA ambush and a gun battle between an undercover 22 SAS British Army units and an IRA active service unit near Kesh. 26-year old Kieran Fleming, an IRA volunteer, drowned in the Bannagh River, near Kesh, as he tried to escape from the gun battle. The IRA men had been attempting to bomb a Royal Ulster Constabulary police car in Kesh. Slater was posthumously awarded the Military Medal for his bravery in the action.

Slater's Directory 1870
This information from Slater's Directory of 1870 tells of the economic activity about Kesh at that time.

Local attractions
 The Lough Erne Hotel, originally a Royal Irish Constabulary barracks, later a tapestry house, and now the only hotel in Kesh by the Glendurragh River at the top of the main street. Still has the old gaol doors intact from the 1800s.
 Belleek Pottery, world famous producer of Parian china.
 The Boa Island carved stones, graveyard and enclosure are Scheduled Historic Monuments sited in the townland of Dreenan 5 miles from Kesh
 Castle Archdale Estate and marina, a large amenity that includes gardens, walks, water sports and other facilities; the complex also has a large caravan and camping park
 Drumrush Lodge, a restaurant and caravan park that also has a private marina that offers a full range of water sports
 Lough Erne is nearby and linked with Kesh by a navigable river terminating at the marina in the middle of the village beside the Lough erne Hotel
 Muckross, an inland lakeside 'beach' which used to be popular with families is now taken over almost exclusively by jet-skiers.
 North Fermanagh Club, a football (during winter) and cricket (during summer) venue on the Crevenish Road

Kesh Primary School

The date the school was established is unknown but the Clogher Records record a school in Kesh, Rosscolban in 1820 beside the schoolmaster's house. The original building was built in 1865 (as marked on the memorial stone on the front of the school). In 1957, the Right Hon Edward Archdale  paid for the renovation of the school of 1 classroom making it into 3 classrooms and a PE hall. Many children were demanding enrolment as a result of the closure of other rural schools in 2001 WELB decided to build a new school. Building started in 2006 and the same year the school was ready to intake an average of 200 children.

Notable Kesh connections

 Comedian Frank Carson spent time as plasterer in Kesh and is responsible for the work in some of the local authority housing on the Ederney Road. He is warmly remembered.
 Although born in Oxford, former Arsenal and England defender Martin Keown spent a lot of his childhood in Kesh as his father is from near the village.
 Former England cricket captain, Michael Vaughan has often been spotted in Kesh, his wife Nichola is from a village nearby.
Frank Ormsby, poet and former editor of The Honest Ulsterman, lives in the neighbouring village of Irvinestown.
Former Rangers and Heart of Midlothian striker, Kyle Lafferty is from Kesh.

Transport
Kesh railway station on the Enniskillen and Bundoran Railway was opened on 13 June 1866 and closed on 1 October 1957.

The greatest impetus ever provided to Kesh was the arrival of the railway in 1866. It provided employment and a focus for traffic to and from the station. Hardware shops and shops providing for the needs of farmers could now carry a greater variety of goods and stock could be replenished more quickly than by horse and cart. Cattle and other livestock could also be transported to distant markets after being bought in local fairs such as Ederney and Lack itself. Butter and eggs could be produced in greater quantities and markets in Belfast and Dublin easily reached by train. Another boon to Kesh was the establishment of the Creamery there although this was done against much local opposition.

Ulsterbus routes 194 (Enniskillen to Pettigo) and 83A (Omagh to Kesh) stop in Kesh

Demography 
On Census Day (27 March 2011) the usually resident population of Kesh Settlement was 1,039, accounting for 0.06% of the NI total. Of these:
 18.67% were aged under 16 and 16.84% were aged 65 and over
 49.57% of the population were male and 50.43% were female
 19.35% belong to or were brought up in the Catholic religion and 76.9% belong to or were brought up in a 'Protestant and Other Christian (including Christian related)' religion; and
 72.67% indicated that they had a British national identity, 10.68% had an Irish national identity and 22.81% had a Northern Irish national identity.

References

Villages in County Fermanagh
Civil parish of Magheraculmoney
Fermanagh and Omagh district